John Benjamin Keane was an Irish architect of the 19th century. (d.1859). He was engineer on the River Suir navigation.

Buildings
Mercy International Centre, Baggot Street, Dublin (c1827)
Tullamore Courthouse (1835)
Carlow County Infirmary, Carlow (1838)
The Mausoleum at Oak Park (c 1841)
Nenagh Courthouse (1843)
St. John's Church, Waterford (1845)
Waterford Courthouse (1849)
Ennis Courthouse (1852), with architect Henry Whitestone
Barmouth Castle, County Louth
Carlow Gaol
Saint Francis Xavier Church, Dublin

References

Irish architects
1859 deaths
Year of birth missing